Haplogroup IJ (M429/P125) is a human Y-chromosome DNA haplogroup, an immediate descendant of Haplogroup IJK (formerly known as Haplogroup F-L15). IJK is a branch of Haplogroup HIJK.

The immediate descendants of IJ  are Haplogroup I and Haplogroup J.  Its sole sibling is K (which includes most of the world's male population).

Haplogroup IJ derived populations account for a significant proportion of the pre-modern populations of Europe (especially Scandinavia and the Balkans), Anatolia, the Caucasus, the Middle East (especially Arabia, Levant and Mesopotamia) and coastal North Africa. As a result of mass migrations during the modern era, they are now also significant in The Americas and Australasia.

Origin 
A 2008 estimate suggested that the most recent common ancestor of haplogroup IJ could have lived 30,500–46,200 years ago, while another estimate suggests 43,000–45,700 years.

Both of the primary branches of haplogroup IJ – I-M170 and J-M304 – are found among modern populations of the Caucasus, Anatolia, and Southwest Asia. This tends to suggest that Haplogroup IJ branched from IJK in  West Asia, Caucasus and/or the Middle East.

Examples of the basal/paragroup Haplogroup IJ* (M429) were first reported in a 2012 study of genetic diversity in Iran, by Grugni et al.  These individuals were reported to be positive for M429 and negative for the SNPs M170 and M304, which define haplogroup I and haplogroup J respectively. However, because the researchers filtered for relatively few SNPs, these individuals may have carried less well-known SNPs equivalent to M170 and M304. Given the limited scope of the testing – and the small number of haplogroup IJ samples that were discovered – few firm conclusions have yet been drawn.

An inference may also be made that both IJ (M429) and its sole sibling, Haplogroup K (M9) diverged from the parent Haplogroup IJK closer to the Caucasus and the Middle East than to East Asia, due to the evolutionary distance of IJK from its direct ancestor, haplogroup HIJK.

IJ split in a typically disjunctive, almost mutually-exclusive geographical pattern, with J-M304 far more common in the Caucasus, and I-M170 far more common in Europe; the age of IJ and its subclades suggest that IJ probably entered Europe through the Balkans, some time before the last glacial maximum (about 26,500 years BP). The same geographic corridor (the Balkans) also supported later gene flows, including the Early Neolithic Farmers from Anatolia about 9,000 years BP.

Phylogeny and distribution
IJ (M429, P123, P124, P125, P126, P127, P129, P130, S2, S22, per ISOGG 2008)
IJ* – found at low frequency in parts of Iran.
I (M170, P19, M258, P38, P212, U179, Haplogroup I notation updated to ISOGG 2008; L41, M170, M258, P19_1, P19_2, P19_3, P19_4, P19_5, P38, P212, U179)
I* (unobserved)
I1 (M253, M307, M450/S109, P30, P40, S62, S63, S64, S65, S66, S107, S108, S110, S111, per ISOGG 2008; also L64, L75, L80, L81, L118, L121/S62, L123, L124/S64, L125/S65, L157.1, L186, L187, L840, M307.2/P203.2) Typical of populations of Scandinavia and Northwest Europe, with a moderate distribution throughout Eastern Europe
 I1* (unobserved)
 I-CTS12768 (no phylogenetic name as of 2021)
 I-CTS12768* – living example in Sweden.
 I-Z17954 (no phylogenetic name as of 2021)
 I-Z17954* (unobserved)
 I-Y21293 – living example in Netherlands.
 I-Y19092 – living examples in Normandy and Finland.
 I1a –  DF29/S438
I1a*   - living examples in Sweden, Denmark and Portugal.
I1a1   M227
I1a1*   -
I1a1a   M72
I1a2   L22/S142
I1a2*   -
I1a2a   P109
I1a2b   L205
I1a2c   L287
I1a2c*   -
I1a2c1   L258/S335
I1a2c1*   -
I1a2c1a   L296
I1a2d   L300/S241
I1a2e   L813/Z719
I1a3    S244/Z58
I1a3*   -
I1a3a   S246/Z59
I1a3a*   -
I1a3a1   S337/Z60, S439/Z61, Z62
I1a3a1a   Z140, Z141
I1a3a1a*   -
I1a3a1a1   L338
I1a3a1b   Z73
I1a3a1c   L573
I1a3a1d   L803
I1a3a2   Z382
I1a3b   S296/Z138, Z139
I1a4   S243/Z63
I1b   Z131 
I2 (M438/P215/S31) (formerly I1b)
I2* (unobserved)
I2a (P37.2) (formerly I1b1) Typical of the South Slavic peoples of the Balkans, especially the populations of Bosnia, Croatia, Serbia and Slovenia ; also found with high haplotype diversity values, but lower overall frequency, among the West Slavic populations of Slovakia and the Czech Republic; a node of elevated frequency in Moldavia correlates with that observed for Haplogroup I2a (but not for Haplogroup I1)
I2a*
I2a1 (M423)
I2a1*
I2a1a (P41.2/M359.2) (formerly I1b1a)
I2a2 (M26) (formerly I1b1b) Typical of the population of the so-called "archaic zone" of Sardinia; also found at low frequencies among populations of Southwest Europe, particularly in Castile, Béarn, and the Basque Country
I2a2*
I2a2a (M161) (formerly I1b1b1)
I2b (M436/P214/S33, P216/S30, P217/S23, P218/S32) (formerly I1b2)
I2b*
I2b1 (M223, P219/S24, P220/S119, P221/S120, P222/U250/S118, P223/S117) (formerly I1b2a - old I1c) Occurs at a moderate frequency among populations of Northwest Europe, with a peak frequency in the region of Lower Saxony in central Germany; minor offshoots appear in Moldavia and Russia (especially around Vladimir, Ryazan, Nizhny Novgorod, and the Republic of Mordovia), and among speakers of Persian (including Iranians, Hazaras in Afghanistan and Pakistan, and Tajiks in Afghanistan)
I2b1*
I2b1a (M284) (formerly I1b2a1) Generally limited to a low frequency in Great Britain
I2b1b (M379) (formerly I1b2a2)
I2b1c (P78) (formerly I1b2a3)
I2b1d (P95) (formerly I1b2a4)
J (12f2.1, M304, S6, S34, S35)
J*
J1 (M267) Typical of populations of the Middle East, Dagestan and Semitic-speaking populations of North Africa and East Africa
J1*
J1a (M62)
J1b (M365)
J1c (M367, M368)
J1d (M369)
J1e (M390)
J2 (M172) Typical of populations of Mesopotamia, Anatolia, Southern Europe, and the Caucasus, with a moderate distribution throughout Southwest Asia, Central Asia, South Asia, and North Africa
J2*
J2a (M410)
J2a*
J2a1 (DYS413≤18)
J2a2 (M340)
J2b (M12, M314, M221; also M102, Z2497, Z2499 Z2500/CTS10660)
J2b* At least one living example found in Uzbekistan.
J2b1 (M205; includes former J2b1b/J-PF7344) 
 J2b1 Found in ancient remains (3,650 years BP) in Lebanon.
 J2b1a (YP31, Y3165, Y167062, et al.) Living examples found in Greece and Italy.

References

See also
Haplogroup
Human Y-chromosome DNA haplogroups
Y-DNA haplogroups in populations of Europe
Y-DNA haplogroups in populations of South Asia
Y-DNA haplogroups in populations of East and Southeast Asia
Y-DNA haplogroups in populations of the Near East
Y-DNA haplogroups in populations of North Africa
Y-DNA haplogroups in populations of the Caucasus
Y-DNA haplogroups by ethnic group
Haplogroup I
Haplogroup I1
Haplogroup I2
Haplogroup J
Haplogroup J2

IJ